Abdel Hakim Harkat (born 4 July 1968) is an Algerian judoka. He competed at the 1992 Summer Olympics and the 1996 Summer Olympics.

References

External links
 

1968 births
Living people
Algerian male judoka
Olympic judoka of Algeria
Judoka at the 1992 Summer Olympics
Judoka at the 1996 Summer Olympics
Place of birth missing (living people)
Mediterranean Games gold medalists for Algeria
Mediterranean Games medalists in judo
Competitors at the 1991 Mediterranean Games
Competitors at the 1993 Mediterranean Games
21st-century Algerian people
African Games medalists in judo
African Games gold medalists for Algeria
Competitors at the 1987 All-Africa Games
Competitors at the 1991 All-Africa Games